Biel is a village in the canton of Valais, Switzerland. It was an independent  municipality until 2001, when it merged with Ritzingen and Selkingen into the municipality Grafschaft.

External links

Villages in Valais
Former municipalities of Valais